Sunnan or Sundan is a village in the municipality of Steinkjer in Trøndelag county, Norway.

Its population in 2003 was 233, but since 2004 it is not considered an "urban settlement" by Statistics Norway, and its data is therefore not registered.

Sunnan was the terminal railway station of the Hell–Sunnan Line from 1905. In 1926, the line was extended and became part of the Nordland Line.

References

Villages in Trøndelag
Steinkjer